Marc Bouwer is a fashion designer and costume designer based in New York City. He is a member of the Council of Fashion Designers of America

Career
Upon winning the South African Vogue Young Designers Award, Marc Bouwer moved to New York City.  Shortly after, Bouwer's portfolio was noticed by designer Halston. Bouwer apprenticed with Halston fine tuning his design skills, particularly draping.  Bouwer's "cut" and modern use of stretch fabrics, such as jersey and spandex, in evening wear coined the term "bathing suit gown" and gave way to "athletic glamour".  Opening house in 1990 with business partner, Paul Margolin, Marc Bouwer Couture has since graced the covers and pages of publications including Harper's Bazaar, Cosmopolitan, Vanity Fair, Glamour, and InStyle. Actress Angelina Jolie arrived at the 2004 Academy Awards in a white satin Marc Bouwer gown, later named one of the best Oscar dresses of all time by André Leon Talley.   Most recently Bouwer helped in reintroducing us to loyal client and friend, Shania Twain, designing the costumes for her Still The One Tour which opened December 1, 2012 at Caesars Palace.

Bouwer was the first American designer to produce a virtual fashion show in response to economic struggle across the globe as well as in respect to the environment. As opposed to bringing us to Bryant Park, Bouwer took us, and his inaugural Spring/Summer 2009 collection, to the web.  Not only did this new medium of fashion allow friends and clients to experience the collection if unable to physically attend a show, but it also opened the experience into the offices and homes of stylists, buyers, journalists, and fashionistas everywhere.  Bouwer felt it was his "social and environmental responsibility" to pave way to such a movement "minimizing impact and waste".  Bouwer virtually presented his Fall 2010 collection, starring Candice Swanepoel, before taking the experience one step further.  In February 2011 Bouwer was the first designer to present a virtual 3D fashion show with his Fall 2011 collection starring model Selita Ebanks.

Awards
Bouwer's awards for avoiding animal products in his fashions include a PETA Humanitarian Award, and The United States Humane Societies “Compassion in Fashion Award”.

Television appearances

References

Further reading
http://www.wwd.com/fashion-news/a-sense-of-drama-vivienne-tam-alice-roi-carlos-miele-milly-by-michelle-smith-marc-bouwer-584305
Time (magazine)
http://www.people.com/people/archive/article/0,,20122302,00.html

External links
 http://marcbouwer.com/
 https://web.archive.org/web/20110228071441/http://www.elle.com/Runway/Ready-to-Wear/Spring-2008-Ready-to-Wear/MARC-BOUWER/MARC-BOUWER
 http://www.cfda.com/members/?member_id=679&tab=a
 https://www.imdb.com/name/nm1071153/

Living people
South African fashion designers
Year of birth missing (living people)